Derek Hardman (born September 13, 1986) is an American football guard who is currently a free agent. He was signed by the Tampa Bay Buccaneers as an undrafted free agent in 2010. He played college football at Eastern Kentucky.

Professional career

Tampa Bay Buccaneers
On April 26, 2010, Hardman was signed by the Tampa Bay Buccaneers as an undrafted free agent. On May 2, 2013, he was waived by the Buccaneers.

Detroit Lions
On May 3, 2013, Hardman was claimed off waivers by the Detroit Lions. On August 23, 2013, he was cut by the Lions.

References

External links
Tampa Bay Buccaneers bio
Eastern Kentucky Colonels bio

1986 births
Living people
American football offensive tackles
American football offensive guards
Eastern Kentucky Colonels football players
Tampa Bay Buccaneers players
Detroit Lions players
People from Spencer, West Virginia